Slovene Uruguayans comprise Slovene migrants to Uruguay and their descendants. Nowadays they amount to approx. 3,000.

Montevideo is home to a social and cultural association, Primera Sociedad Eslovena Transmurana de Montevideo, established 1935.

See also
 Slovenes
 List of Slovenes

References

Uruguay
European Uruguayan

Ethnic groups in Uruguay
Immigration to Uruguay
Slovenia–Uruguay relations